Kolinio "Koli" Rakoroi (born 1 July 1956) is a Fijian former rugby union footballer, he played as a lock or number eight. He was the captain for the Flying Fijians in the 1987 Rugby World Cup.

Career
His first international cap for the Flying Fijians was against Tonga, at Suva, on June 18, 1983. He was present in the 1987 Rugby World Cup roster, which he captained. His last cap was against Tonga, at Suva, on August 29, 1987. He also played for Suva.

References

External links
 

Fiji international rugby union players
Fijian rugby union players
1956 births
Rugby union locks
Rugby union number eights
I-Taukei Fijian people
Living people